Spodnji Brnik (in older sources also Spodnji Bernik) is a settlement in the Municipality  of Cerklje na Gorenjskem in the Upper Carniola region of Slovenia.

Spodnji Brnik is also the closest settlement to Ljubljana Jože Pučnik Airport, commonly known as Brnik Airport.

Church

The local church is dedicated to Saints Simon and Jude and was first mentioned in documents from 1511, when it was extended and dedicated, its predecessor on the site probably dating to the early Middle Ages.

Notable people
Notable people that were born or lived in Spodnji Brnik include:
Lojze Ilija (1905–1982), writer

References

External links

Spodnji Brnik on Geopedia

Populated places in the Municipality of Cerklje na Gorenjskem